DJ Ricardo! is a Puerto Rican-American DJ and producer. He is best known for conceptualizing, compiling, editing, and mixing  the first annual mixed dance compilation series on Ultra Records, known as the DJ Ricardo! presents: Out.Anthems, in celebration of gay pride month.

Discography

Mixed compilations
2005: Ultra. Dance Mexico (album) Ultra Dance 
2006: DJ Ricardo! Presents Out.Anthems 
2007: DJ Ricardo! Presents Out.Anthems 2 
2008: DJ Ricardo! Presents Out.Anthems 3 
2009: DJ Ricardo! Presents Out. Anthems 4
2009: Cuba Con Leche 
2010: DJ Ricardo! Presents Out. Anthems 5
2011: DJ Ricardo! Presents Out. Anthems 6 
2012: DJ Ricardo! Presents Out. Anthems 7
2013: DJ Ricardo! Presents Out. Anthems 8

References

External links

American DJs
American dance musicians
American electronic musicians
American house musicians
Record producers from New York (state)
Club DJs
Hunter College alumni
Puerto Rican LGBT musicians
Living people
DJs from New York City
Musicians from Brooklyn
People from Mayagüez, Puerto Rico
Remixers
Year of birth missing (living people)
Electronic dance music DJs
21st-century LGBT people